The tar is an ancient, single-headed frame drum. It is commonly played in the Middle East and North Africa. The tar's drumhead is struck with one hand.

The drumhead was usually made from animal skin like goats, while the actual frame was made of wood

See also

References

Further reading
 

Hand drums
Asian percussion instruments
Arabic musical instruments
North African musical instruments